Cables Wynd House, better known as the Leith Banana Flats or the Banana Block because of its curved shape, is a nine-storey local authority housing block in Leith, Edinburgh. The building, in fact, has ten storeys. The ground floor is called Cables Wynd and the nine floors above constitute Cables Wynd House. This often leads to confusion in postal and other services.

History 

Under construction between 1962 and 1965, for many families the complex offered a welcome improvement over the overcrowding and slum housing conditions that were still common problems at the time. There is now extensive security in the building which includes a 24-hour manned concierge, key fob entry system and security camera system on every walkway and in each of the 4 lifts. The building is well maintained with walkways and lifts cleaned on a daily basis by council employees.

In 2012, communal heating and other energy measures were installed by the  City of Edinburgh Council.

Design 

The building was designed by Alison & Hutchinson & Partners under the leadership of Robert Forbes Hutchinson. It contains 212 flats, which have a 24-hour concierge service situated on the ground floor, and CCTV coverage. Most of the properties use deck access, but the ground floor flats are accessed via individual front doors. Some of these properties are preferentially allocated to older people, but in recent years many young families have been allocated larger flats in the building. All but five of the flats remain in public ownership .

The entire building (along with the nearby Linksview House of similar design, though not curved) was awarded an 'A' listing by Historic Environment Scotland from January 2017, being cited as one of the best examples of 'brutalist' architecture in Scotland. This is the highest rating which can be awarded to a building in Scotland.

Use in fiction 

In Irvine Welsh's Trainspotting, the flats were the childhood home of the character Simon "Sick Boy" Williamson.

In 2007, the block was used during filming of Wedding Belles, which was also created by Irvine Welsh.

See also
List of Category A listed buildings in Edinburgh
List of post-war Category A listed buildings in Scotland

References 

Brutalist architecture in Scotland
Buildings and structures in Leith
Housing estates in Edinburgh
Category A listed buildings in Edinburgh
1962 establishments in Scotland
Public housing in Scotland
Residential buildings completed in 1965